Lee Jun-Yeob (born 21 May 1990) is a South Korean footballer who plays as midfielder for Gangneung City in Korea National League.

Career
He was selected by Gangwon FC in 2013 K League Classic Draft. He made his K-League debut match against Jeju on 3 November 2012.

References

External links 

1990 births
Living people
Association football defenders
South Korean footballers
Chinese Super League players
Henan Songshan Longmen F.C. players
Gangwon FC players
Daejeon Korail FC players
Gangneung City FC players
Korea National League players
K League 1 players
South Korean expatriate sportspeople in China
South Korean expatriate footballers
Expatriate footballers in China
Association football midfielders